Star One (also referred to as Arjen Anthony Lucassen's Star One) is a Dutch progressive metal supergroup/side-project of Arjen Anthony Lucassen of Ayreon fame.

The band has released three albums to date: their first in 2002, their second in 2010, and most recently a third in 2022, plus a live album in 2003, and features four different singers: Russell Allen (Symphony X), Damian Wilson (Threshold, Headspace), Dan Swanö (Edge of Sanity, Nightingale), and Floor Jansen (After Forever, ReVamp, Nightwish).

Unlike Ayreon, albums do not follow one storyline; instead, each song is a different story with a sci-fi concept, most of the tracks based on existing movies and series. The band takes its name from the second season finale of Blake's 7. The band includes four singers alternating in all the songs, not including Lucassen, who sings occasionally, plays all guitars and keyboards and writes and composes all the songs. The third studio album deviates from this, having a different guest singer on each track.

History

Origins and first album (2002–2003) 
Star One was born out of the remnants of an abandoned collaboration between Lucassen and Iron Maiden frontman Bruce Dickinson. 
Dickinson proposed the idea and the two exchanged ideas and put together four songs, Lucassen writing the music and Dickinson writing the lyrics.
The project was abandoned however after Lucassen mentioned the project on the internet and Dickinson's manager called off negotiations. 
Instead of completely abandoning the material that had already been produced, Lucassen decided to put his own lyrics to the music and created Star One.

When asked on the "Ask Arjen Anything" channel of communication if there would be another Star One album, Lucassen simply stated "Probably". However, he later declared:

"Space Metal was really magic. I am afraid that I will fail to capture the same atmosphere and actually ruin it! I am actually against sequels; you cannot repeat the same atmosphere and feeling like you had with the first album."

Second album (2009–2010) 
In an interview conducted by Ragnarok Radio in October 2009 Arjen stated Star One is "definitely not dead."

In October 2009 in another interview, with Lebmetal.com, Arjen said he was working on what might become another Star One album: "In the meantime I will be working on a new, heavier album. Possible a new Star One album, but then again things never work out the way I plan them", and in a November 2009 interview with Lagrossradio.com, Arjen stated that he was definitely working on a new Star One album and that he had already written and recorded a song.

In March 2010, a "demo listening party" was held where several members of the arjenlucassen.com messageboard were allowed to listen to the first (only instrumental) demos for the new Star One album.
In August of the same year, Arjen revealed the title of this second album, Victims of the Modern Age, and announced that it was ready. The album was released in October 2010.

In a Q&A in August 2018, Lucassen stated that returning to Star One was "always an option, it's the same as with all my other projects. [...] For Star One, I have to be in a certain mood, because it's based on guitar riffs." He confirmed that his next project would not be a Star One album, as his latest work, the Ayreon album The Source, was already heavy-oriented, and stated that if a new Star One album came to be, it would probably be with different singers.

Third album (2020–present) 
After releasing the Ayreon album Transitus in September 2020, Lucassen stated in several comments in social media that he was working on a third Star One album. On February 9, 2021 he published a video announcement, confirming this, and said that music is basically ready at this point and he's working on lyrics at the moment. He also promised a "big change": instead of having four singers for the whole album, each track will have its own separate singer. In October 2021, it was announced that the name of album would be Revel in Time along with the release date. The album was released on February 18, 2022.

Music 
The music of Star One is heavier than that of Lucassen's progressive rock/metal opera project Ayreon, drawing influences from 1970s space rock and blending them with modern progressive metal. Lucassen explained that the songwriting was different in that Star One songs are built on guitar riffs whereas Ayreon songs stem primarily off chord arrangements. However, similarities still exist mainly in the song arrangements, the multi-layered vocals, and the use of synthesizers and Hammond organs as part of the main instrumentation.

Members

Instrumentalists

Singers

Discography 
Space Metal (2002)
Live on Earth (live album) (2003)
Victims of the Modern Age (2010)
Revel in Time (2022)

References

External links 
 
 Interview with Arjen on Lebmetal.com October 2009
 

Arjen Anthony Lucassen
Dutch progressive metal musical groups
Heavy metal supergroups
Musical groups established in 2002
2002 establishments in the Netherlands